The following are the national records in athletics in Cambodia maintained by Cambodia's national athletics federation: Khmer Amateur Athletics Federation (KAAF).

Outdoor

Key to tables:

+ = en route to a longer distance

h = hand timing

Men

Women

Indoor

Men

Women

References
General
World Athletics Statistic Handbook 2019: National Outdoor Records
World Athletics Statistic Handbook 2018: National Indoor Records
Specific

External links
 KAAF web site 

Cambodia
Records
Athletics